Ankyofna Encada (born 6 October 1979) is a Bissau-Guinean former footballer who played as a midfielder for Horta, Oliveira do Hospital, Sporting Covilhã, União Micaelense, Pinhalnovense and Sporting Beira, as well as the Guinea-Bissau national team.

References

1979 births
Living people
Bissau-Guinean footballers
Guinea-Bissau international footballers
F.C. Oliveira do Hospital players
S.C. Covilhã players
CU Micaelense players
C.D. Pinhalnovense players
Campeonato de Portugal (league) players
Liga Portugal 2 players
Association football midfielders
Bissau-Guinean expatriate footballers
Bissau-Guinean expatriate sportspeople in Portugal
Expatriate footballers in Portugal
Bissau-Guinean expatriates in Mozambique
Expatriate footballers in Mozambique